The Boyer Lectures are a series of talks by prominent Australians, presenting ideas on major social, scientific or cultural issues, and broadcast on  ABC Radio National.

The Boyer Lectures began in 1959 as the ABC (Australian Broadcasting Commission, now the Australian Broadcasting Corporation) Lectures. They were modelled on the BBC's Reith Lectures, and renamed in 1961 after Richard Boyer (later Sir Richard), the ABC board chairman who had first suggested the lectures. The series is broadcast every year in between September and December on ABC Radio National.

The lectures are delivered by prominent Australians selected by the Australian Broadcasting Corporation's Board, intended to stimulate thought, discussion and debate in Australia on a wide range of subjects, examining key issues and values.

Lectures

1950s 
1959 – Dr David Forbes Martyn – "Society in the Space Age"

1960s 
1960 – Prof Julius Stone – "Law and Policy in the Quest for Survival"
1961 – Prof W. D. Borrie – "The Crowding World"
1962 – Prof W. G. K. Duncan – "In Defence of the Common Man"
1963 – Prof J. D. B. Miller – "Australian and Foreign Policy"
1964 – George Ivan Smith – "Along the Edge of Peace"
1965 – Prof Sir John Eccles – "The Brain and the Person"
1966 – Sir Macfarlane Burnet – "Biology and the Appreciation of Life"
1967 – Robin Boyd – "Artificial Australia"
1968 – Prof W. E. H. Stanner "After the Dreaming"
1969 – Sir Zelman Cowen "The Private Man"

1970s 
1970 – Dr H. C. Coombs – "Role of Institutions in Our Lives"
1971 – Prof Basil Hetzel – "Life and Health in Australia"
1972 – Prof Dexter Dunphy – "The Challenge of Change"
1973 – Prof Sir Keith Hancock – "Today, Yesterday and Tomorrow"
1974 – Hugh Stretton – "Housing & Government"
1975 – Dame Roma Mitchell – "The Web of Criminal Law"
1976 – Manning Clark – "A Discovery of Australia"
1977 – Douglas Stewart – "Writers of The Bulletin"
1978 – Sir Gustav Nossal – "Nature's Defence"
1979 – Bob Hawke – "The Resolution of Conflict"

1980s 
1980 – Bernard Smith – "The Spectre of Truganini"
1981 – Prof John Passmore – "The Limits of Government"
1982 – Prof Sir Bruce Williams – "Living with Technology"
1983 – Justice Michael Kirby – "The Judges"
1984 – Shirley Hazzard – "Coming of Age in Australia"
1985 – Helen Hughes – "Australia in a Developing World"
1986 – Prof Eric Willmot – "Australia The Last Experiment"
1987 – Davis McCaughey – "Piecing Together a Shared Vision" (multicultural Australia)
1988 – "Postscripts: eight previous Boyer lecturers revisit their lectures"
1989 – Max Charlesworth – "Life, Death, Genes and Ethics: Biotechnology and Bioethics"

1990s 
1990 – Tom Fitzgerald – "Between Life and Economics"
1991 – Fay Gale and Ian Lowe – "Changing Australia (changes through technology)"
1992 – Geoffrey Bolton – "A View From the Edge: An Australian Stocktaking (history)"
1993 – Presented by six Indigenous Australians in the International Year of the World's Indigenous People (IYWIP): Getano Lui, Dr Ian Anderson, Jeannie Bell, Mandawuy Yunupingu, Dot West and Noel Pearson – "Voices of the Land"
1994 – Kerry Stokes – "Advance Australia Where?"
1995 – Eva Cox – "A Truly Civil Society"
1996 – Prof Pierre Ryckmans – "Aspects of Culture"
1997 – Prof Martin Krygier – "Between Fear and Hope: Hybrid Thoughts on Public Views"
1998 – David Malouf – "A Spirit of Play: The Making of Australian Consciousness"
1999 – Dr Inga Clendinnen – "True Stories"

2000s 
2000 – Chief Justice Murray Gleeson – "The Rule of Law and the Constitution"
2001 – Prof Geoffrey Blainey – "This Land is all Horizons: Australian Fears and Visions"
2002 – Ian Castles (Not delivered due to bereavement)
2003 – Owen Harries – "Benign or Imperial? Reflections on American Hegemony"
2004 – Peter Conrad – "Tales of Two Hemispheres"
2005 – Archbishop Peter Jensen – "The Future of Jesus"
2006 – Ian Macfarlane – "The Search For Stability"
2007 – Graeme Clark – "Restoring The Senses"
2008 – Rupert Murdoch – "A Golden Age of Freedom"
2009 – General Peter Cosgrove – "A Very Australian Conversation"

2010s 
2010 – Professor Glyn Davis – "The Republic of Learning: higher education transforms Australia"
2011 – Geraldine Brooks – "The Idea of Home"
2012 – Professor Marcia Langton – "The Quiet Revolution: Indigenous People and the Resources Boom"
2013 – Governor-General Quentin Bryce – "Back to Grassroots" 
2014 – Professor Suzanne Cory – "The promise of science: a vision of hope"
2015 – Dr Michael Fullilove – "A larger Australia"
2016 – Professor Sir Michael Marmot – "Fair Australia: Social Justice and the Health Gap"
2017 – Professor Genevieve Bell – "Fast, Smart and Connected: What is it to be Human, and Australian, in a Digital World?"
2018 – Professor John Rasko – "Life Re-engineered"
2019 – Filmmaker Rachel Perkins – "The End of Silence"

2020s 
2020 – Philanthropist and business leader Dr Andrew Forrest  – "Rebooting Australia: How ethical entrepreneurs can help shape a better future"
2021 – Actor John Bell – "Shakespeare: Soul of the Age"
2022 – Noel Pearson – "Who we were and who we can be"

See also
History of the Australian Broadcasting Corporation

References

Further reading

External links

Archived transcripts

Australian culture
Lecture series
1959 establishments in Australia
Australian Broadcasting Corporation radio programs
Australian Broadcasting Corporation original programming